Pleasant Run Creek can refer to two waterways in the United States:
 Pleasant Run Creek (Indiana), a stream that flows through the city of Indianapolis, Indiana
 Pleasant Run Creek (Missouri), a stream in northern Barton and southern Vernon counties in Missouri